Billie Rex Kelley (August 23, 1926 – October 2, 2015) was an American football player in the National Football League who played tight end for the Green Bay Packers.  Kelley played college football for Texas Technological College (now Texas Tech University) before being drafted by the Green Bay Packers in the 23rd round of the 1949 NFL Draft. He played professionally for one season, in 1949, recording 17 catches for 222 yards and 1 touchdown. Kelley died in Arlington, Texas, in 2015.

References

1926 births
2015 deaths
People from Lubbock County, Texas
American football tight ends
Texas Tech Red Raiders football players
Green Bay Packers players